Siddhartha Shankar Ray (20 October 1920 – 6 November 2010) was an Indian lawyer, diplomat and Indian National Congress politician from West Bengal. In his political career he held a number of offices, including Union Minister of Education (1971–72), Chief Minister of West Bengal (1972–77), Governor of Punjab (1986–89) and Indian Ambassador to the United States (1992–96). He was at one point the main troubleshooter for the Congress Party.

Biography
Ray was born in a Baidya family. Ray's father, Sudhir Kumar Ray, was a well known barrister of Calcutta High Court and a member of the Indian National Congress and his mother Aparna Devi, was the elder daughter of the barrister and nationalist leader Chittaranjan Das and Basanti Devi grew up in England. Ray's sister is Justice Manjula Bose (1930–2016) who was a senior judge of the Calcutta High Court; along with Padma Khastagir, she was one of the first female judges of the Calcutta High Court. Ray was also related to Sudhi Ranjan Das, a former Chief Justice of India and Satish Ranjan Das, a former Advocate General of Bengal and a Law Member of the Viceroy's Executive Council.

Ray studied at, Mitra Institution, Bhowanipore Branch, Calcutta, Presidency College, Calcutta and University Law College, of the University of Calcutta. In college and university, he was active in both sports and politics. In 1941, he was elected as student Under-Secretary in the Calcutta University Institute Elections and was put in charge from time to time of various departments including Students' Aid Fund, Debates, Sports and Socials. He was also the Debate Secretary and later the General Secretary of the Calcutta University Law College Union. As a sportsman he captained the Presidency College cricket team. He was the captain of the team that won the Inter Collegiate cricket Championship in 1944. He had scored three double centuries and 1000 runs for three consecutive seasons. He was also a keen footballer in Calcutta playing for the Kalighat Club. He was a University Blue in this sport and represented the Calcutta University in inter-varsity matches. In 1939, he was the captain of the victorious Presidency College football team which won both the Elliot and Hardinge Birthday Shields. He was also interested in lawn tennis and table tennis.

Later Ray was called to the bar by the Honourable Society of Inner Temple, London, in 1947. While in London he played cricket for the Indian Gymkhana Club.

Career

Upon his return from England in 1946, Ray joined the Calcutta Bar as a junior of Justice Ramaprasad Mukherjee, who later became a Judge and Chief Justice (Acting) of the High Court of Calcutta. In 1954 he became one of the three junior Central Government counsels in Calcutta.

In 1957 he was elected to the Bhowanipore Assembly seat which he won by a large majority, becoming the youngest member of the West Bengal Cabinet under the leadership of Dr. Bidhan Chandra Roy. He was appointed Minister of Tribal Welfare and Law Department, West Bengal. In 1962, he was re-elected to the state's Legislative Assembly as an Independent Candidate. In 1971, he became the Union Cabinet Minister of Education & Youth Services for the Government of India. He was also the Union Cabinet Minister of West Bengal Affairs of the Government of India.

After the Congress won the General Election of 1972, he became the Chief Minister of West Bengal from 19 March 1972 to 21 June 1977. He took office shortly after the Bangladesh Liberation War, and his administration was faced with the massive problem of resettling over a million refugees in various parts of the state. The crackdown on Naxalites also took place during this period.

Later, he had the distinction of serving as the Governor of Punjab from 2 April 1986 to 8 December 1989. When the Congress came back to power once again in Delhi in 1991, Ray was sent as India's Ambassador to the United States. He remained in the United States from 1992 to 1996. Prior to that, he was the Leader of Opposition in the West Bengal Legislative Assembly from 1991-1992.

Role in the emergency 
Siddhartha Shankar Ray had a major role in the imposition of The Emergency from 1975 to 1977. He proposed to the prime minister Indira Gandhi to impose an "internal emergency" and also drafted a letter for the President to issue the proclamation and showed her how democratic freedom could be suspended while remaining within the ambit of the Constitution.

Retirement

During his retirement between 1996 and 2010, Ray returned to his law practice as a Barrister of the Calcutta High Court.

Ray died of kidney failure on 6 November 2010 at the age of 90.

Legacy 

A philanthropic society named "Siddhartha Shankar Ray Foundation" was formed by Mr. Rajesh Chirimar in memory of Ray with the due consent of Maya Ray. The society engages in various social activities and will be celebrating the Birth Centenary Year of Shri Siddhartha Shankar Ray.

References

External links
 Official Biographical Sketch in Lok Sabha Website
 S.S. Ray - an administrator par excellence, Indo-Asian News Service, 7 November 2010
 S.S. Ray accorded a state funeral, Indo-Asian News Service, 7 November 2010
 Ray, Bengal's last aristocrat politician, departs, The Times of India, 7 November 2010
 A leader of many hues,  The Times of India, 7 November 2010
 Sukharanjan Sengupta, Misunderstood for role in Naxal period, The Times of India, 6 November 2010
 Legal eagle with excellent court etiquette, The Times of India, 7 November 2010
 Ray: The Left’s whipping boy till the end, The Statesman, 6 November 2010
 Punjab's friendly troubleshooter, The Tribune, 7 November 2010

1920 births
2010 deaths
Bengali Hindus
Politicians from Kolkata
Alumni of the Inns of Court School of Law
Presidency University, Kolkata alumni
University of Calcutta alumni
Ambassadors of India to the United States
Chief Ministers of West Bengal
Das family of Telirbagh
Deaths from kidney failure
Governors of Punjab, India
Indian barristers
Members of the Cabinet of India
Education Ministers of India
Leaders of the Opposition in West Bengal
People of the Emergency (India)
Chief ministers from Indian National Congress
Indian cricket administrators
Presidents of the Cricket Association of Bengal
20th-century Indian lawyers
People from Kolkata
Indian National Congress politicians from West Bengal
India MPs 1971–1977
Lok Sabha members from West Bengal
People from Uttar Dinajpur district
Indian National Congress (U) politicians